Army Museum in Białystok is a military museum located in Bialystok the capital of Podlaskie Voivodeship in north-eastern Poland. It is the largest of its kind in that region. First opened in 1968, since 1976 it has been operating as an independent museum unit with a macro-regional range. It is currently a self-governing cultural institution of the city of Białystok. As part of the Army Museum, until the end of 2016, there was a Branch,  the Siberia Memorial Museum.

History
The museum was established in September 1968 as a branch of the District Museum (now the Podlaskie Museum in Białystok). It was the result of many years of research and collecting passion a large group of people in love with the military past of the Białystok region and the society of the Białystok region wishing to document the armed struggles of ancestors, from the beginning of the Polish state until the period independence fights after the end of World War II in the years 1945–1956. The original seat of the museum was the Guest Palace. It soon turned out that the building could no longer contain exhibits that were still flowing in. In 1974, the museum moved to the building at 7 Kilińskiego Street, its current location. In 1976, it was granted the status of an autonomous macro-regional museum. The organizer and long-time director of the museum was Col. Dr. Zygmunt Kosztła. Using the contacts established during earlier military service, he quickly gathered a collection of exhibits, which are still the basis of the collection owned by the museum. He also began research on the military history of the Bialystok region. In 1980, a project was created to establish a research center by establishing a Military History Research Center in Białystok conducting scientific research and publishing activities.

In 2010 the director of the museum changed. The current prof. dr hab. Krzysztof Filipów was replaced by Robert Sadowski, MA. He began to change the exhibition and nature of the museum's activities. In 2010, the Siberia Memorial Museum began to be organized as a branch of the existing institution.

Permanent exhibitions
"Against two enemies. Military history of Podlasie and its inhabitants in 1939-1956", the exhibition presents the Podlasie episodes of World War II.

September 1939 - the first diorama is a life-size slice of a Polish trench from the September campaign. It presents the defense of the Lomza 33rd infantry regiment near Novgorod on 8–10 September;
Two enemies - some dioramas are dedicated to army soldiers occupying the Podlasie region. Among them you can find a Red Army soldier from the troops entering Bialystok in 1939, and a second lieutenant in the Wehrmacht from Operation Barbarossa;
Monte Cassino - many soldiers fighting in this battle came from the north-eastern borderlands of the Second Polish Republic. Among them was Ryszard Kaczorowski, the last president of the Republic of Poland born in exile. Diorama presents the operation of the Bren machine gun in position, built of authentic stones brought from the battlefield;
Eastern Front 1944-1945 - in the summer of 1944, the front passed through Białystok for the third time during this war. The German 12th Armored Division took part in the city fights. Another mannequin presents a grenadier from the 286th Infantry Division in winter uniform during fights on the Narew line;
Lusatia 1945 - another diorama presents the 9th Dresden Infantry Division, organized in Bialystok. She took part in the battle of Bautzen, one of the bloodiest in which the Polish Army fought during the war,

Independence underground - the last diorama presents an episode of World War II history so far absent from the exhibition at the Army Museum, namely the post-war independence underground. The exhibition combines traditional forms of presentation as well as interactive and multimedia elements. Professionally arranged dioramas appeal to the imagination of visitors. The radio plays contain accounts of participants in war events, while they are read by well-known Polish actors. Special glasses allow you to view photos in three dimensions. Numerous info kiosks contain exhibit descriptions, historical information, accounts, memories and multimedia.

"Polish Army 1956-2010" - The exhibition shows the evolution of the uniforms and equipment of the Polish Army in the second half of the twentieth century. The issue of the Polish Army's participation in NATO combat missions and UN peacekeeping missions, which significantly changed the equipment of Polish soldiers over the past few years, was not overlooked. The exhibition consists of mannequins in full uniforms, equipment and armament. The arrangements were inspired by units stationed in Bialystok:

2nd Podlasie Communications Regiment of the Internal Defense Forces,
25th Communications Regiment, Grouping of MON Defense Units,
18 Bialystok Mechanized Brigade named after Marshal Edward Rydz-Śmigły,
18 reconnaissance regiment.

In addition, units stationed in the cities of the north-eastern region of Poland: Ełk, Zambrów and Ciechanów are presented. The Polish Army exhibition 1956-2010 was arranged for the scenery of a military warehouse with concrete walls with visible formwork imprints and cable bundles. Character strengthens properly selected lighting. The showcases were made of old military storage boxes of various sizes.

Gallery

External links

References

Museums established in 1968
1968 establishments in Poland
Museums in Białystok